In mathematics, specifically in abstract algebra, a torsion-free abelian group is an abelian group which has no non-trivial torsion elements; that is, a group in which the group operation is commutative and the identity element is the only element with finite order. 

While finitely generated abelian groups are completely classified, not much is known about infinitely generated abelian groups, even in the torsion-free countable case.

Definitions 

An abelian group  is said to be torsion-free if no element other than the identity  is of finite order.

More generally, the free abelian group  is torsion-free for any .

A non-finitely generated countable example is given by the additive group of the polynomial ring  (the free abelian group of countable rank). 

Yet more involved examples are given by groups of higher rank.

Groups of rank 1

Rank

The rank of an abelian group  is the dimension of the -vector space .

If  is torsion-free then it injects into . Thus, torsion-free abelian groups of rank 1 are exactly subgroups of the additive group .

Classification
Torsion-free abelian groups of rank 1 have been completely classified. To do so one associates to a group  a subset  of the prime numbers, as follows: pick any , for a prime  we say that  if and only if  for every . This does not depend on the choice of  since for another  there exists  such that . Baer proved that  is a complete isomorphism invariant for rank-1 torsion free abelian groups.

Classification problem in general
The hardness of a classification problem for a certain type of structures on a countable set can be quantified using model theory and descriptive set theory. In this sense it has been proved that the classification problem for countable torsion-free abelian groups is as hard as possible.

Notes

References
 
 
 .
 .
 

Algebraic structures
Abelian group theory
Properties of groups